Mimolaia diversicornis is a species of longhorn beetle (family Cerambycidae) from Bolívar, Venezuela. It was described in 2010 by Maria Helena M. Galileo and Ubirajara R. Martins.

References

Calliini
Beetles of South America
Invertebrates of Venezuela
Beetles described in 2010